Athletics is one of several sports contested at the quadrennial Commonwealth Youth Games. It has featured at every edition of the competition since its inauguration in 2000. Athletes under nineteen years old may compete (in contrast to the usual under-18 format of other youth athletics competitions).

Editions

Games records

Men

Women

Mixed

Notes

References

 
Commonwealth Youth Games
Commonwealth
Commonwealth Youth Games